In Indian folklore, the Mande Burung is an alleged ape-like creature said to inhabit the Meghalaya subtropical forests in the remote Garo Hills of the Northeast India.

Generally described as a large, hairy bipedal hominoid, some believe that this animal, or its relatives, may be found around the world under different regional names, such as the Yeti of Tibet and Nepal, the Ban-manush in Bangladesh, the Yeren of mainland China, and the Bigfoot of the Pacific northwest region of the United States and all of the Canadian provinces, including British Columbia where the majority of all Sasquatch reports and sightings occur.

References
 "On the trail of the Indian Yeti", BBC (2008)
 "'Yeti hair' to get DNA analysis", BBC (2008)
 "Meghalaya’s monster makeover", Hidustan Times (2007)
 "Search for Bigfoot in Meghalaya's jungles', IANS (2007)

Further reading
 Will the Indian Army’s Yeti post boost interest in cryptozoology? (Down-to-earth.org) (2019)

Indian legendary creatures
Hominid cryptids